In a hierarchal business organization, especially in a matrix management structure, the relationship between a worker and their direct supervisor or leader can be classified as solid-line reporting (also called direct reporting) or dotted-line reporting (also called indirect reporting). The use of "solid-line" versus "dotted-line" is based on the visual representation of the organizational structure in an organizational chart.

Solid-line (direct) reporting
Solid-line reporting is a direct reporting relationship between a supervisor and their supervised worker. A worker who has a supervisor to whom they report directly is often called a direct report.

Dotted-line (indirect) reporting
Dotted-line reporting describes a relationship between a worker and a secondary supervisor/leader who provides additional oversight and guidance to the worker in the execution of their work. The intent of the dotted-line relationship is to ensure that the dotted-line supervisor/leader has the authority to provide some level of influence and leadership to the worker, including goal-setting.

The dotted-line supervisor/leader will provide input regarding the worker’s performance to the solid-line supervisor for inclusion in the worker’s annual performance review.

References

Sources
 The Synergy of One: Creating High-Performing Sustainable Organizations ... - Michael J. Dreikorn
 Designing Your Organization: Using the STAR Model to Solve 5 Critical Design ... - Amy Kates, Jay R. Galbraith

Organizational theory
Human resource management